Andorra competed at the 2012 Winter Youth Olympics in Innsbruck, Austria. The Andorran team consisted of 4 athletes competing in 3 sports.

Medalists

Alpine skiing

Andorra qualified one boy and girl in alpine skiing.

Boy

Girls

Freestyle skiing

Andorra qualified one boy in freestyle skiing.

Ski Half-Pipe

Snowboarding

Andorra qualified one girl in snowboarding.

Girl

See also
Andorra at the 2012 Summer Olympics

References

2012 in Andorran sport
Nations at the 2012 Winter Youth Olympics
Andorra at the Youth Olympics